Elections to the Tripura Tribal Areas Autonomous District Council (TTAADC) were held on 6 April 2021. 25 of the 28 elected seats in the Autonomous District Council are reserved for Scheduled Tribes.

There were 865,041 eligible voters in the elections. The votes were counted on 10 April 2021 with a victory for the TIPRA-INPT alliance. The TIPRA party led alliance won 18 seats in the election while the BJP led alliance could win only 9 seats.

Campaign

The Left Front consisting of the Communist Party of India (Marxist), Communist Party of India, All India Forward Bloc and RSP declared its candidates list for 28 seats on 6 March 2021. The Indigenous People's Front of Tripura (IPFT) announced it candidates list for 18 seats on 7 March 2021. The TIPRA of Maharaja Kirit Pradyot Deb Barman and its alliance party Indigenous Nationalist Party of Tripura (INPT) announced their first list of candidates for 17 seats and 5 seats respectively on 8 March 2021. The Indian National Congress (INC) also announced its list of candidates for all 28 seats on 8 March 2021.

Party Candidates

Incidents
The total voting process was peaceful. However there were reports of minor disturbances in two constituencies, namely Budhjung Nagar-Wakkinagar and Amtali-Golaghati. The TIPRA accused the ruling BJP for creating the disturbance.

Results

The votes were scheduled to be counted on 10 April 2021 and in the counting the TIPRA party won 16 seats with its alliance partner INPT winning 2 seats in the election while the BJP won 9 seats with 1 seat going to an Independent candidate.

Results by party and alliance

Winning Candidates

Constituency wise results

Members of the Executive Committee

The Executive committee of the TTAADC was formed by notification of the CEO on 23 April 2021 by TIPRA, the winning party alliance after getting elected and installed by the Governor of the state. The list of the Executive members are as follows:

As on March 2023

See also
Tipraland
 2015 Tripura Tribal Areas Autonomous District Council election
 2010 Tripura Tribal Areas Autonomous District Council election
 2005 Tripura Tribal Areas Autonomous District Council election
 2000 Tripura Tribal Areas Autonomous District Council election

References

2021 elections in India
Elections in Tripura
History of Tripura (1947–present)
Autonomous district council elections in India
Local elections in Tripura